Brzice is a municipality and village in Náchod District in the Hradec Králové Region of the Czech Republic. It has about 200 inhabitants.

Administrative parts
Villages of Běluň, Komárov, Proruby and Žďár are administrative parts of Brzice.

Notable people
Otto Špaček (1918–2007), World War II fighter pilot

References

External links

Villages in Náchod District